Megaloceras is a genus of the nautiloid order Oncocerida that lived during the Silurian period of the Paleozoic. It is included in the family Karoceratidae, characterized by compressed straight or exogastricly curved shells with slender ventral siphuncles.

References

 Megaloceras Paleobiology Database 7/9/12
 Sepkoski's list of Cephalopods
 Walter C. Sweet, 1964. Nautiloidea-Oncocerida. Treatise on Invertebrate Paleontology, Part K. Geological Society of America and University of Kansas Press.

Prehistoric nautiloid genera
Silurian cephalopods